Laurence "Lar" Prendergast  is an Irish sportsperson.  He plays hurling with his local club Oulart–The Ballagh and with the Wexford senior inter-county team. He is the son of
former Wexford hurling star Jimmy Prendergast.

Playing career

Club

Inter-county

Prendergast rarely appears on field unless as a sub since his senior debut during the National Hurling League against Clare. However during a repeat of last year's league final he got his chance to play full on the field.

References

Living people
Oulart-the-Ballagh hurlers
Wexford inter-county hurlers
Year of birth missing (living people)